The Landlord is a 2007 short comedy film starring Will Ferrell, Pearl McKay, and featuring Adam McKay.

Plot 
In the film, Ferrell's character is harassed by his landlord for overdue rent money. The landlord is a two-year-old girl (played by McKay's daughter, Pearl) who dresses as a princess, swears at her tenant and is finally calmed by taking Will's beer.

Production 
The film was directed by Adam McKay and Drew Antzis and written by Ferrell and McKay.

Release 
The film premiered on April 17, 2007 on Ferrell and McKay's video website, Funny or Die. Since its debut, the video has been viewed more than 80 million times, and is a "Chosen One" meaning it was never rated by Funny or Die members. Shortly after, a short film featuring outtakes from the movie premiered.

Reception 
In 2007 the Guy's Choice Awards, presented by Spike TV, voted The Landlord "Most Viral Video."  Entertainment Weekly put it on its end-of-the-decade, "best-of" list, saying, "The only thing funnier than a foulmouthed 2-year-old? A foulmouthed 2-year-old named Pearl berating Will Ferrell on FunnyOrDie.com."

Good Cop, Baby Cop
In June 2007, Pearl McKay and Will Ferrell reunited for Good Cop, Baby Cop in which McKay plays a tough police officer who forces Ferrell to sign a confession and smacks Ferrell in the face with a phone and a phone book. This was announced to be Pearl McKay's final performance.

In popular culture
In 2014's Boyhood, Mason (Ellar Coltrane), is seen watching the clip on the Funny or Die website in 2007, when the clip came out.

A brief clip of the video can be seen in The Big Short, also directed by McKay.

References

External links
 The Landlord at Funny or Die
 Good Cop, Baby Cop at Funny or Die

2007 films
2007 comedy films
2007 short films
Films directed by Adam McKay
Funny or Die
Films about landlords
2000s English-language films